Utah's dual language immersion program was created in 2008 to help students achieve proficiency in a second language in preparation for future careers and the global economy. In the early school years, the students are immersed for half a day in a target language – Mandarin Chinese, French, Spanish, Portuguese, or German – and half a day in English. In high school, students can participate in a bridge program, allowing them to take language classes that would give them concurrent college credit at certain universities throughout Utah. Over 160 schools in Utah participate in the program. Proven benefits include an increased performance on standardized tests, fluency in a target language, and an increased cultural awareness and sensitivity.

Background 
Senate Bill 80 (S.B. 80), The Critical Languages Program, sponsored by Senator Howard Stephenson, was passed in 2007, leading to the creation of initiatives that established a Governor's World Language Council; the Utah World Language Roadmap; and eventually the passing of S.B. 41 International Initiatives in 2008, the last of which led to the creation of Utah's dual language immersion program.

Goals 
The program's goal is to help students achieve a high enough proficiency level in a second language to be used in a future career as they become participants in a global economy.  Languages available in the program include Spanish, Portuguese, Mandarin Chinese, French, and German. Plans are being made to add Russian and Arabic to the program.

Model 
The students are immersed in a foreign language for half of the day, and in English for the other half.

In the immersion language half of the day for grades 1-3, students spend 20% of their school day learning math; 15% in Social stud, Science, Physical Education (P.E.), Art, Health, and Music; and 15% of their day in the target language literacy. For the other half of the day, students spend most of their time in English Language Arts, with the remaining 15% of the school day in English reinforcement of the subjects learned in their immersion language.

In grades 4 and 5, the percentage changes: 25% of the day is spent learning Math and Science in the immersion language, 25% in immersion language literacy, 25% in English Language Arts, 25% in Math and Social Studies in English, while Music, Art, P.E., and Health are taught in both languages.

In sixth grade, the learning schedule is mostly the same as in grades 4 and 5, but with a switch; the science and social studies classes have now switched places. Science is now taught in English, and Social Studies is now taught in the immersion language.

In the junior high years, students spend more time learning in English, but must take two courses taught in the immersion language: a world languages class, and either Foundations of Social Studies, Health/Humanities, or World Geography.

Beginning in Fall 2016, high school students who pass an AP language course and exam in ninth grade will have the option to enroll in the Bridge Program, where they can enroll in one of three courses per school year that, if passed, will award them with concurrent upper-division university credit, leaving students only two credits shy of a minor in their immersion language by the time they arrive at the university. Seven of Utah's universities are involved in this Bridge Program. It began first with the University of Utah, but has expanded to include Brigham Young University, Utah State University, Weber State University, Utah Valley University, Southern Utah University, and Utah Tech University.

Participating districts 
The school districts that offer this dual language immersion program, covering 163 schools statewide, include:

Several charter schools are also involved in the DLI program, in Lehi (Chinese), Bluffdale (German), Spanish Fork (Spanish), and Layton (Spanish), Utah.

The program is expanding by 20 to 25 schools every year. Most classes in the program are for English-native speakers. However, in areas of the state where there is a higher concentration of Spanish-speaking immigrants, an English Language immersion-style program is available.

Utah's DLI program has inspired similar dual language immersion programs throughout the United States, in places like Arizona, Idaho, Wyoming, and South Carolina.

Benefits 
Along with second language skills, proven benefits of the DLI program include improved performance on standardized tests, where they perform better, or as well as, students on in an immersion program; increased cultural sensitivity as they become more aware of other world cultures; and more.

It is not only the language that the students are immersed in, but the culture as well. In schools where Mandarin is taught, for example, Chinese lanterns decorate the halls, Taiwanese music is played, and native food, like dumplings and pot stickers, is served in the cafeterias. In one school where Spanish is taught, classrooms are decorated with flags from Spanish-speaking countries, posters of Spanish artists, and clocks that show the time in those countries.

References

Language immersion
Education in Utah
Language education in the United States
2008 establishments in Utah